Barabati-Cuttack is a Vidhan Sabha constituency of Cuttack district, Odisha, India.

This constituency includes 25 wards of Cuttack.

Elected Members

Elected member from the Barabati-Cuttack constituency is:

2019: (90): Mohammed Moquim (INC)

Cuttack City constituency

Most of the areas of Barabati-Cuttack constituency were under the Cuttack City constituency before 2009. Eleven elections were held between 1961 and 2004.
Elected members from the Cuttack City constituency are:
2019: (90): Mohammed Moquim (INC)
2014: (90): Debasish Samantary (BJD)
2009: (90): Debasish Samantary (BJD)
2004: (44): Samir Dey (BJP)
2000: (44): Samir Dey (BJP)
1995: (44): Samir Dey (BJP)  
1990: (44): Sayed Mustafiz Ahmed (Janata Dal)
1985: (44): Sayed Mustafiz Ahmed (Janata Party)
1980: (44): Srikant Panda (Congress-I)
1977: (44): Biswanath Pandit (Janata Party)
1974: (44): Srikant Panda (Utkal Congress)
1971: (41): Bhairab Chandra Mohanty Jana Congress
1967: (41): Biren Mitra (Congress)
1961: (99): Biren Mitra (Congress)
1957: (70): Biren Mitra (Congress)
1951: (78): Biren Mitra (Congress)

2019 Election Result

2014 Election Results
In 2014 election, Biju Janata Dal candidate Debashish Samantaray defeated Indian National Congress candidate Mohammed Moquim by a margin of 14,289 votes.

2009 Election Results
In 2009 election, Biju Janata Dal candidate Debashish Samantaray defeated Indian National Congress candidate Suresh Mohapatra by a margin of 24,485 votes.

Notes

References

Assembly constituencies of Odisha
Politics of Cuttack district